The 50th Independence Anniversary Commemoration Medal (Sinhala: ස්වර්ණ ජයන්ති පදක්කම swarna jayanthi padakkama) was a military decoration awarded by the Military of Sri Lanka to servicepersons of all actively serving ranks in both the regular and volunteer forces in commemoration of the 50th anniversary of Sri Lanka's Independence from the United Kingdom, on the 4 February 1998. A formal recommendation from service commanders was required for the award of the medal.

References

External links
Sri Lanka Army
Sri Lanka Navy
Sri Lanka Air Force
Sri Lanka Police
Ministry of Defence : Sri Lanka

Military awards and decorations of Sri Lanka
Awards established in 1998
1998 establishments in Sri Lanka